The 1966 Trophées de France season was the 3rd season of the Trophées de France. The season was totally dominated by Brabham. Despite winning the World Championship for Drivers, Jack Brabham found time to win four of the six races to win this title as well. This was done, driving for his own team, Brabham Racing Organisation, piloting either a Brabham BT18, or a BT21. The others two races were won by Denny Hulme, also for racing for the Brabham Racing Organisation team. For the record, the Brabham marque also took third in the drivers standing with Roy Winkelmann Racing's, Alan Rees.

Trophées de France
Champion:  Jack Brabham

Runner Up:  Denny Hulme

Results

Table

References

Trophées de France seasons